Charles "Don" Alias (December 25, 1939 in New York City – March 28, 2006 in New York City) was an American jazz percussionist.

Alias was best known for playing congas and other hand drums. He was, however, a capable drum kit performer: for example, Alias played drums on the song "Miles Runs the Voodoo Down" from trumpeter Miles Davis's album Bitches Brew (1969) when neither Lenny White nor Jack DeJohnette was able to play the marching band-inspired rhythm requested by Davis.

Alias performed on hundreds of recordings and was perhaps best known for his associations with Miles Davis and saxophonist David Sanborn, though he also performed or recorded with the group Weather Report, singer Joni Mitchell, pianist Herbie Hancock, the Brecker Brothers, Jaco Pastorius, Pat Metheny, Nina Simone and many others. Alias was born in New York City and arrived in Boston in the early 1960s intending to study medicine but, after playing congas in a number of local bands, made an abrupt career switch.

Discography

As sideman
With Philip Bailey
 Soul on Jazz (Heads Up International, 2002)
With Carla Bley
 Sextet (Watt, 1987)
 Fleur Carnivore (Watt, 1988)
 The Very Big Carla Bley Band (Watt, 1990)
 Looking for America (Watt, 2002)
With Jonathan Butler
 Head to Head (Mercury, 1993)
With Uri Caine
 Toys (JMT, 1996)
With David Clayton-Thomas
 Bloodlines (DCT, 1999)
With Marc Cohn
 Marc Cohn (Atlantic, 1991)
With Miles Davis
 Bitches Brew (Columbia, 1970)
 On the Corner (Columbia, 1972)
 Amandla (Warner Bros., 1989)
 Miles Davis at Newport 1955-1975: The Bootleg Series Vol. 4 (Columbia Legacy, 2015)
With Jack DeJohnette
 Oneness (ECM, 1997)
With Eliane Elias
 So Far So Close (Blue Note, 1989)
With Michael Franks
 Abandoned Garden (Warner Bros., 1995)
With Joe Farrell
 Penny Arcade (CTI, 1973)
With Roberta Flack
 Oasis (Atlantic, 1988)
 The Christmas Album (Capitol, 1997)
With Dan Fogelberg
 The Innocent Age (Full Moon, 1981)
With Bill Frisell
 Unspeakable (Elektra Nonesuch, 2004)
With Hal Galper
 The Guerilla Band (Mainstream, 1971)
With Kenny Garrett
 Black Hope (Warner Bros, 1992)
With Don Grolnick Group
 Medianoche (Warner Bros., 1995)
 The Complete London Concert (Fuzzy Music, 2000)
With Herbie Hancock
 The New Standard (Verve, 1996)
With Elvin Jones
 Merry-Go-Round (Blue Note, 1971)
With Dave Liebman
 Sweet Hands (Horizon, 1975)
With Joe Lovano
 Tenor Legacy (Blue Note, 1993)
With Pat Metheny Group
 Imaginary Day (Warner, 1997)
With Bob Mintzer
 One Music (DMP, 1991)
With Joni Mitchell
 Don Juan's Reckless Daughter (Asylum, 1977)
 Mingus (Asylum, 1979)
 Shadows and Light (Asylum, 1980)
With Jaco Pastorius
 Jaco Pastorius (Epic, 1976)
 Word of Mouth (Warner Bros., 1980–81)
With Weather Report
 Weather Report (Columbia, 1971)  – uncredited
 Black Market (Columbia, 1976)
With Lou Reed
 Ecstasy (Sire, 2000)
With Sanne Salomonsen
 In a New York Minute (Virgin, 1998)
With Carlos Santana and John McLaughlin
 Love Devotion Surrender (Columbia, 1973)With Lalo Schifrin Black Widow (CTI, 1976) With Marlena Shaw Love is in Flight (Verve, 1988)With Nina Simone To Love Somebody (RCA, 1969)With Jeremy Steig Legwork (Solid State, 1970) 
 Wayfaring Stranger (Blue Note, 1971)
 Energy (Capitol, 1971)
 Fusion (Groove Merchant, 1972)With Ira Sullivan Ira Sullivan (Horizon, 1976)With Steve Swallow Carla (Xtra Watt, 1987)
 Swallow (Xtra Watt, 1991)With James Taylor New Moon Shine (Columbia, 1991)With The Tony Williams Lifetime' Ego'' (Polydor, 1971)

References

External links 
Official Website Don Alias
Don Alias's Interview
Article in Drummerworld 

1939 births
2006 deaths
Musicians from New York City
American jazz percussionists
American jazz drummers
Miles Davis
African-American drummers
Weather Report members
Conga players
Bongo players
Djembe players
Tambourine players
Triangle players
Batá drummers
American marimbists
Timbaleros
Timpanists
American session musicians
Snare drummers
20th-century American drummers
American male drummers
The Tony Williams Lifetime members
Blood, Sweat & Tears members
Jazz musicians from New York (state)
American male jazz musicians
20th-century American male musicians